The Kings Mountain Mine is one of the largest lithium mines in the United States. The mine is located in eastern United States in North Carolina. In 2013, it was reported that the Kings Mountain mine had reserves amounting to 45.6 million tonnes of lithium ore grading 0.7% lithium thus resulting 0.32 million tonnes of lithium.
In 2017 it was reported that the Kings Mountain pegmatite district had 5.9 million metric tons of lithium.

References 

Lithium mines in the United States